WFDL-FM (97.7 FM) is a radio station broadcasting an adult contemporary format. Licensed to Lomira, Wisconsin, United States, the station serves the Fond du Lac area.  The station is currently owned by Terry Holzmann, through licensee Radio Plus, Inc., and features programming from Westwood One.

History
The station was assigned the call sign WFDL on June 26, 1990.  On October 14, 2002, the station added the "-FM" suffix, concurrent with an AM sister station taking on the WFDL call sign.

References

External links

FDL-FM
Mainstream adult contemporary radio stations in the United States
Radio stations established in 1993
1993 establishments in Wisconsin